Bueng Kum is one of the 50 districts (Khet) of Bangkok, Thailand. From north clockwise, it is bounded by Bang Khen, Khan Na Yao, Saphan Sung, Bang Kapi, and Lat Phrao.

History
Bueng Kum was separated from Bang Kapi on 4 September 1989. It consisted of three sub-districts: Khlong Kum, Khan Na Yao, and Saphan Sung. On 14 October 1997, Khan Na Yao and Saphan Sung were elevated to districts, leaving Bueng Kum with a sole sub-district, Khlong Kum.

Bueng Kum was named so because of a lake ("bueng" means 'lake') used as water reservoir for flood prevention. There are also plants called "kum" (Crataeva sp.) around the lake. The lake is part of Seri Thai Park.

Administration
The district is divided into three sub-districts (khwaeng).

District council
The District Council for Bueng Kum has seven members, who each serve four-year terms. Elections were last held on 6 June 2010. The results were:
Democrat Party - Seven seats

Places
 Seri Thai Park, a public park
 Seri Thai Memorial Hall and Museum in Seri Thai Park
 Nawamin Phirom Park

References

External links
 BMA website with the tourist landmarks of Bueng Kum
 Bueng Kum district office (Thai only)

 
Districts of Bangkok